Banpará is a Brazilian regional bank, founded in 1959 by the Pará state government. Its primary activity is supporting the banking needs of the state government and its employees’.

Controversies 
The bank was the centerpoint of a 1984 scandal which saw over 10 million dollars siphoned away from its coffers into bank accounts controlled by the then-governor, Jader Barbalho, and his associates. The accusation involved the CEO, a political ally of Barbalho, and the financial director, both banned from working in the financial sector for 10 and 3 years, respectively.

References 

Banks of Brazil
Companies based in Pará (state)